The following is a list of American football films.

See also 
 List of sports films
 List of highest grossing sports films

Notes

References 

American football
Films